Vesicle transport protein GOT1B is a protein that in humans is encoded by the GOLT1B gene.

Got1p is a protein that aides in vesicle transport through the Golgi apparatus of the cell. Got1p has a calculated mass of 15.4 kDa and consists of 138 residues. It is believed that the protein is a tetra-spanning membrane protein, and is evolutionarily conserved. Homologes of the protein have been found in Caenorhabditis elegans, Plasmodium falciparum, and in mammals. GOT1 is normally associated closely with Sf2p (encoded by sft2), which is another protein of similar function. In vivo, It has been found that the removal of these two proteins results in defects in endosome-Golgi traffic and ER-Golgi traffic. In vitro, the removal of got1 specifically, results in a defect in ER-Golgi transport in relation to vesicle tethering to Golgi membranes. The exact contribution that the protein has towards vesicle tethering is still a mystery, however, it is suspected that Got1p is involved in the release of Ca2+ in the Golgi membranes, causing ion channels associated with vesicle tethering to be affected.

References

Further reading